Terry Abram is an American retired ice hockey defenseman and coach who was an All-American for North Dakota.

Career
Abram was a standout defenseman at South St. Paul HS helping the team reach the state semifinal as a senior. He was one of the few American players recruited to North Dakota during the 1960s and began playing for the varsity club in the fall of 1966. In his first two seasons, Abram helped UND win back-to-back conference co-championships and reach the NCAA tournament twice. Abram was named an All-American in 1968 and hoped to lead his team into the national championship for a third consecutive season the following year. Unfortunately, North Dakota was upset in the first round of the WCHA tournament and Abram's college career ended with the loss.

After graduating, Abram turned down a chance to play in the Chicago Blackhawks organization and instead turned to coaching. He spent the rest of the decade behind the bench for two different high schools in Minnesota, Roseau and Anoka. While at Roseau, Abram coach future NHLer Neal Broten. In 1982 Abram became the head coach for St. Thomas and he immediately turned around the program. While he was with the program for only five years, Abram provided several first for the Tommies: he was the first coach to win 20 games in a season, recording 25 wins in both 1985 and '86. He led the team to the NCAA Tournament for the first time in 1984. Two years later he guided St. Thomas to the inaugural MIAC tournament championship. Abram resigned in 1987, never having a losing season in college hockey.

In 2007 Abram was in the inaugural class of the South St. Paul Athletic Hall of fame.

Statistics

Regular season and playoffs

College head coaching record

Awards and honors

References

External links

1947 births
Living people
American men's ice hockey defensemen
Ice hockey players from Minnesota
People from South St. Paul, Minnesota
North Dakota Fighting Hawks men's ice hockey players
St. Thomas (Minnesota) Tommies men's ice hockey coaches
AHCA Division I men's ice hockey All-Americans